Mashaldar (also Romanized as Mash‘aldār) is a village in Pir Yusefian Rural District, in the Central District of Alborz County, Qazvin Province, Iran. At the time of the 2006 census, its population was 3,155, with 702 families.

References 

Populated places in Alborz County